Sulusaray or Çiftlik, in Antiquity and the early Middle Ages known as Sebastopolis or Heracleopolis, is a town and a district of Tokat Province in the Black Sea region of Turkey. Sulusaray is about 68 km from the center of Tokat, and about 30 km from Artova town. The site is situated on a plain surrounded by mountains and the Çekerek river runs near it. The mayor is Şahin Hasgül (MHP).

Name
The word Sebastopolis comes from Greek Sebastos, the Greek equivalent of the Latin Augustus, while polis means "city".  In some sources the city was named as Heracleopolis (meaning  "the city of Heracles", a Greek deity symbolizing power and strength).

History
The date of foundation of this ancient city is still unknown. Some sources say that it was first established in the first century during the reign of Roman emperor Trajan, and that the city was separated from the districts of Pontus Galaticus/Polemoniacus and was included in the province of Cappadocia. An epitaph inscription about this survives. The epitaph was written as a monument for Arrian, the Governor of the region of Cappadocia.  In Ptolemy's time, it was a town in Pontus Cappadocicus (Ptol. v. 6. § 7), which, according to the Antonine Itinerary (p. 205), was situated on a route leading from Tavium to Sebastia (modern Sivas), and was connected by a road with Caesarea (p. 214). Pliny (vi. 3) places it in the district of Colopene, and agrees with other authorities in describing it as a small town. (Hierocl. p. 703)

Architectural pieces recovered during the diggings organized by the Directorate of the Tokat Museum in 1987 showed that the city was an important settlement during the Hellenistic, Roman and Byzantine periods. The artefacts recovered at the Comana Pontica (Old Tokat) are very similar to those recovered from the city of Sebastopolis, probably these two ancient cities had a close relationship in the past.

Sebastopolis is at the crossroads of east to west route and south and central to north route. This shows the importance of the city during the Roman and Byzantine periods.

The ancient city was surrounded by a city wall made of small, neatly cut stones put together without using mortar. A circular shape temple was discovered at the northeast side of the city, it was made of marble floor. The baths are situated at the eastern part of the Sebastopolis, where the water needed was recovered from the thermal spring located about 3 kilometers to the southwest. Many statues and statuettes, friezes, columns, grave steles and epitaphs have been found during excavations.

References

External links

District governor's official website 
District municipality's official website 
District municipality's official website 
District municipality's official website 

Populated places in Tokat Province
Roman towns and cities in Turkey
Hellenistic colonies in Anatolia
Ancient Greek archaeological sites in Turkey
Geography of Pontus
Districts of Tokat Province